SSAFA – the Armed Forces charity, the Soldiers, Sailors, Airmen and Families Association, is a UK charity that provides lifelong support to serving men and women and veterans from the British Armed Forces and their families or dependents. Anyone who is currently serving or has ever served in the Royal Navy, British Army or Royal Air Force and their families, both regulars and reserves, is eligible for their help.

SSAFA’s professional staff and network of 7,000 volunteers assist more than 90,000 people every year, from World War II veterans to the families of young servicemen and women wounded or killed in Afghanistan. 

Founded in 1885, SSAFA is the UK's oldest national tri-service Armed Forces charity.

Clients

SSAFA offers help and support to all serving and former members of all ranks of the Armed Forces, including:

 Royal Navy, Royal Marines, Army and Royal Air Force
 Volunteer Reserve Forces, including Royal Navy Reserves, Royal Marine Reserves, Army Reserves and Royal Air Force Reserves
 Nursing services.

The following people are also eligible for SSAFA’s support:
 Wives and former wives
 Husbands and former husbands
 Widows and widowers
 Civil partners and former civil partners
 Partners who are, or were, in an established relationship with a Beneficiary
 Children who are dependent on a beneficiary
 Those who provide, or provided, care for a beneficiary.

Welfare advice and support

SSAFA offer welfare advice and support for serving personnel, veterans and their families through a worldwide network of volunteers. Branches in local communities provide help for veterans and their families and committees on military bases help serving families.

For currently serving personnel and their families

Support in service communities 

SSAFA has a network of volunteers on Army, RAF and Naval bases in the UK and around the world who give local support.

Housing for wounded, injured and sick serving personnel and their families 

SSAFA Norton Homes in Selly Oak, Birmingham, and Headley Court, Surrey provide home-from-home accommodation for families visiting wounded injured or sick service or ex-service personnel and outpatients. SSAFA also provides day-to-day management of Fisher House UK at the Queen Elizabeth Hospital Birmingham (QEHB).

Mentoring for injured, wounded or sick service leavers 

SSAFA’s mentoring scheme was set up in 2011 and supports those transitioning out of the Army or RAF due to medical discharge. SSAFA’s volunteer mentors provide support to wounded, injured and sick service leavers through a long-term 'one-to-one' relationship that underpins the transition from the military. SSAFA Mentoring is nationally accredited by the Mentoring and Befriending Foundation.

Adoption for military families 

SSAFA is a registered adoption agency dedicated to helping military families through the adoption process as well.

Additional needs and disabilities support 

SSAFA provide specialised support to military families with additional needs including their Forces Additional Needs and Disability Forum (FANDF).

Short breaks for children and young people from Forces families 

SSAFA coordinates holidays and events that focus on offering new experiences and activities for children and young people from Service families.

Stepping Stone Homes for women and their children with a service connection 

Stepping Stone Homes provide short-term supported accommodation, help and advice during difficult times. Female serving or ex-service personnel, or the female spouses and partners of serving or ex-service personnel, along with their dependent children are all eligible to stay there.

Professional health care 

SSAFA’s professional health care staff provide patient-focussed care to military families worldwide.

Personal support and social work for the RAF 

Working alongside the RAF, but outside the Chain of Command, SSAFA staff provide support for RAF personnel and their families, both Regulars and Reserves.

Independent Service Custody Visiting

SSAFA provides independent oversight of Army Service Custody facilities.

Support available to veterans and their families

Housing advice 

SSAFA offer practical housing advice and support to Armed Forces veterans and their dependents including guidance around housing benefits and accessing social housing.

Debt advice 
SSAFA can help veterans to get advice on dealing with debt when they have fallen behind on their bills or repayments to credit cards and are struggling to get by or at risk of losing their home.

Mobility assistance  
 
SSAFA volunteers seek financial assistance for veterans to help maintain mobility and independence at home. Trained volunteers can help veterans get  mobility equipment such as Electronically Powered Vehicles or mobility scooters, stair lifts, riser and recliner chairs.

Providing household goods 
SSAFA can provide veterans with essential household items, including white and brown goods.

Support for homeless veterans 
SSAFA have a range of specialist services to support veterans who are homeless or facing homelessness.

Support for offenders and ex-offenders 

SSAFA can provide support for:
 Families of veterans whilst they are in custody
 Veterans and their families on release
 Veterans whilst they are in custody.

Residential housing 
St Vincent's Care Home at Ryde provides residential care for older ex-service personnel and their spouses.

The Royal Homes in Wimbledon provide accommodation where widows and daughters of those who used to serve can live independently.

Glasgow's Helping Heroes 
'Glasgow's Helping Heroes' is a service provided by SSAFA in partnership with Glasgow City Council for current and former members of the armed forces and their dependants or carers who live, work or wish to relocate there. Its dedicated team works with national and local government and third sector providers to resolve clients' employment, housing, health, financial and/or social isolation issues.

Forcesline help line 
SSAFA also offers Forcesline, is a free and confidential telephone helpline, live chat, and email service that provides support for both current and ex-servicemen and women from the Armed Forces and for their families.

Locations

SSAFA provides support where it is needed in the UK and worldwide:

 The volunteer network reaches into every county of the UK and 13 countries around the world.
 Volunteers in more than 90 branches provide advice and support to veterans and their families living in local communities.
 Service Committees work on army garrisons, RAF stations and naval establishments with over 60 Committees across the UK and wherever the UK Armed Forces are based worldwide.

SSAFA health care and social work services support the Armed Forces community in 13 countries.

Structure and governance 

SSAFA are governed by a board of Trustees who make and approve SSAFA policy. They oversee the Chief Executive Sir Andrew Gregory  and his Executive team who together look after to day-to-day management of the charity.

SSAFA Trustees are all volunteers who contribute their time and expertise to the management of SSAFA. They have ultimate responsibility for directing SSAFA's affairs and ensuring the charity is solvent, well-run and meet objectives.

All Trustees are also members of the Council and meet regularly to discuss the charity's activities and progress. The Chairman of Council is Lieutenant General Sir Gary Coward KBE CB.

SSAFA’s charitable work is financed by contributions from benevolent funds, generous donations from members of the public and the profits generated by their Health and Social Care department who are contracted by the National Health Service and Ministry of Defence to provide direct support to serving personnel and their families in the UK and overseas.

History
James Gildea founded the Soldiers' and Sailors' Families Association in 1885. In 1919, after the establishment of the Royal Air Force (in 1918), the organisation expanded support to become the Soldiers, Sailors, Airmen and Families Association (SSAFA).  In 1997, SSAFA Forces Help was established when two charities, the "Forces Help Society" and "SSAFA", merged. On 10 April 2013, the charity's name changed to SSAFA as part of a rebranding aimed at improving awareness of the organisation's work amongst members of the armed forces community.

Cultural references
In Foyle's War series six, episode 3 ("All Clear"), Sam volunteers with SSAFA, at Foyle's suggestion.

In the 1960 British drama film Tunes of Glory, directed by Ronald Neame, there is a scene with John Mills involving a SSAFA charity collection.

1940s poster artwork commissioned by SSAFA from Fougasse (cartoonist) is now highly sought after by collectors.

See also
Army Benevolent Fund
British Army
Help for Heroes
RAF Benevolent Fund
Royal Air Force
Royal Air Forces Association
Royal Navy
Royal Navy and Royal Marines Charity
The Royal British Legion

References

Disabled Facilities Grants (A guide to DFGs)

External links
Official website

1885 establishments in the United Kingdom
British veterans' organisations
Organizations established in 1885